Sithamalli Govindan Murugaiyan (15 July 1931 – 5 January 1979), usually called S.G. Murugaiyan, was a communist politician in Tamil Nadu, India. S.G. Murugaiyan was a prominent leader of struggles of Dalits in Mannargudi taluk, and became the first Dalit in the state to be elected as revenue block chairman. In 1977 he was elected Member of Parliament. Two years later he was assassinated.

Personal life

S.G. Murugaiyan was born on 15 July 1931 in Sithamalli, Mannargudi taluk. He hailed from a peasant family. He was the son of Govindan.  Murugaiyan studied up to Matriculation. He married Nagammal in 1955, and had four sons and four daughters.

Struggles in Mannargudi taluk
Murugaiyan emerged as a prominent leader of the Communist Party of India in his local area in the 1950s.

In 1962 Murugaiyan was elected chairman of the Kottur revenue block, being the first Dalit in Tamil Nadu to be elected to such a post. He retained this post until 1970. He also served as the Nochoiour gram panchayat president 1956-1970. Murugaiyan spearheaded struggles of Dalit communities in Kottur, challenging discrimination in terms of access to wells, streets and temples and mobilizing for better housing for villagers. These campaigns were often met with violent resistance, and Murugaiyan was known for carrying knives and firearms. In 1970 he became the president of the Thanjavur District unit of the Kisan Sabha.

Member of Parliament
Murugaiyan was elected to the Lok Sabha (lower house of the parliament of India) from the Nagapattinam constituency in the 1977 Indian general election. He obtained 278,419 votes (53.95%), defeating Thanzai M. Karunnanithi from the Dravida Munnetra Kazhagam.

Murder and legacy
Murugaiyan was stabbed to death on 5 January 1979, in Sithamalli, near his home. The murder took place in broad daylight. CPI blamed "AIADMK goondas" for the murder.

Murugaiyan was one of three prominent communist leaders killed in Tamil Nadu in 1979. Tamil Nadu Chief Minister M.G. Ramachandran hastily travelled to the Sithamalli to pay his respects to the murdered leader. A mass protest was held in Mannargudi after the killing, CPI claimed around 100,000 people took part in the rally. A by-election was held in Nagapattinam, which was won by fellow CPI member K. Murugaiyan. CPI continues to organize memorial events for S.G. Murugaiyan in Tiruvarur District.

References

Communist Party of India politicians from Tamil Nadu
1931 births
1979 deaths
Lok Sabha members from Tamil Nadu
India MPs 1977–1979
Assassinated Indian politicians
People from Tiruvallur district
People from Nagapattinam district
எம்.ஜி.ஆா். போற்றிய போராளி

நாம் தமிழர்-சித்தமல்லி எஸ்.ஜி.முருகையன் புகழ்வணக்கம்

கம்யூனிஸ்ட் தலைவர்களை விமர்ச்சித்து முகநூலில் பதிவிட்டாரா ஜெயானந்த் திவாகரன்?

தஞ்சை மாவட்டத்தில் ரத்தம் சிந்திய கம்யூனிஸ்டுகள்

Forty Years Ago: January 7, 1979 

முத்துப்பேட்டை கூட்டத்தில் தா.பாண்டியன் பேச்சு !

சித்தமல்லியில் இன்று முருகையன் எம்.பி.நினைவு தினம் அனுசரிப்பு

சித்தமல்லி கோ.முருகையன்-நினைவு தினம்

தஞ்சை மாவட்ட களநாயகர்கள் வழியாக சமூக வரலாறு-keetru

எஸ்.ஜி. முருகையன் விவகாரம்: சி.பி.ஐ. விசாரணை கோரி ஆா்ப்பாட்டம்

சர்ச்சையில் சசிகலா குடும்பம் - முகநூல் பதிவு... வெகுண்டெழுந்த கம்யூனிஸ்ட்டுகள்...

இந்திய கம்யூனிஸ்ட் மாநில செயலாளர் முத்தரசன் பேசியுள்ளார்

தஞ்சை தியாகி எஸ்.ஜி.முருகையன் நினைவை போற்றுவோம்

நாடாளுமன்ற உறுப்பினர் எஸ்.ஜி.முருகையன் 43 வது நினைவு தினத்தை முன்னிட்டு 

முன்னாள் எம்பி சித்தமல்லி எஸ்ஜி முருகையன் 43வது நினைவு நாள் அனுசரிப்பு